Giovinezza is a 1952 Italian comedy film directed by Giorgio Pastina and starring Delia Scala, Hélène Rémy and Franco Interlenghi. It was shot at the Cinecittà Studios in Rome. The film's sets were designed by the art director Giovanni Sarazani.

Cast
 Delia Scala as Tamara
 Hélène Rémy as 	Anna
 Franco Interlenghi as 	Mario
 Camillo Pilotto as 	Cesare
 Carlo Sposito as 	Venditore ambulante 
 Virgilio Riento as Matteo
 Eduardo Passarelli as 	Il brigadiere
 Riccardo Billi as 	Venditore ambulante
 Nilla Pizzi as Cantante
 Enrico Luzi as Venditore ambulante
 Alberto Sordi as Alberto		
 Alberto Sorrentino as 	Venditore ambulante	
 Gino Latilla as 	Cantante
 Mario Riva as Venditore ambulante
 Charles Trenet as Cantante

References

Bibliography 
 Powrie, Phil & Cadalanu, Marie . The French Film Musical. Bloomsbury Publishing, 2020.
 Spagnoli, Marco . Alberto Sordi: storia di un italiano. Adnkronos libri, 2003.

External links 
 

1952 films
Italian comedy films
1952 comedy films
1950s Italian-language films
Films directed by Giorgio Pastina
1950s Italian films
Films shot at Cinecittà Studios

it:Giovinezza (film 1952)